AMGE-Caravane, also known as Association des Marocains aux Grandes Ecoles et aux Universités, is a French association founded in 1994, of over 5,000 members dedicated to Moroccan students and alumni.

Objectives
AMGE-Caravane's main objective is to serve Moroccan students and young professionals before, during and after their studies in France, while:

 Helping students make thoughtful academic and professional through informational and orientation operations starting in Morocco and through their arrival in France.
 Giving fair and equal access to the Moroccan firms recruiting services, through the annual Forum Horizons Maroc job fair, as well as business meetings and interview sessions all year long.
 Gathering young Moroccans in France around issues making the headlines of the country, through conferences and seminars with national leaders and experts, as well as cultural and social events.

Branches
AMGE-Caravane is based in Paris, and has branches in Lille, Lyon, Rouen and Toulouse.

References

Student societies in France